La stella che non c'è (English title: The Missing Star) is an Italian 2006 drama film written and directed by Gianni Amelio.

The story talks about an Italian engineer who went to China to fix a defect of old Italian steel-making equipment.

This movie shows real people's life (if not all, at least some) and the changing of society during the rapid development of the country.

Plot summary
Vincenzo is an Italian engineer in a steel mill in bankruptcy, which is being acquired by a group of Chinese men. Vincenzo, not well understanding the real consequences of his work, is sent to China because there must advertise and repair a particular machine factory. Vincenzo gets help from a young translator of Chinese, and the two falls in love; but he, when he returns to Italy, finds out that the factory is purchased, and that all Italian workers are laid off. So Vincenzo goes to China in an almost personal challenge to fix a potentially dangerous fault to the same machine now in China in spite of local people's indifference.

Cast 

Sergio Castellitto: Vincenzo Buonavolontà
Tai Ling: Liu Hua
Angelo Costabile: young worker 
He Hiu Sun: Mr. Chong
Catherine Sng: Chinese secretary
Xu Chungqing: Director of the Office in Shanghai

External links 
 
La stella che non c’è @ mymovies.it (in Italian)
La stella che non c’è @ Yahoo (in Italian)

2006 films
2006 drama films
Italian drama films
2000s Italian-language films
Chinese-language films
Films directed by Gianni Amelio
2000s Italian films